Mistaken Identity is the debut solo album of American guitarist and Living Colour-member Vernon Reid, released in June 1996 on Sony Music-imprint label 550 Music. It features contributions from his backing band Masque, and production was handled by Reid, hip hop producer Prince Paul, and jazz producer Teo Macero. The album's title was inspired by Reid's experience with cultural identity in his life.

Track listing
"CP Time" 
"Mistaken Identity" 
"You Say He's Just A Psychic Friend" 
"Who Are You [Mutation 1]" 
"Lightnin'" 
"The Projects" 
"Uptown Drifter" 
"Saint Cobain" 
"Important Safety Instructions! [Mutation 2]" 
"What's My Name" 
"Signed Fictitious" 
"Call Waiting To Exhale [mutation 3]" 
"My Last Nerve" 
"Freshwater Coconut" 
"Mysterious Power" 
"Unborne Embrace"

Personnel 
 Vernon Reid – guitars both real and imagined, whispering
 Don Byron – clarinet, bass clarinet
 DJ Logic – turntables
 Leon Gruenbaum – keyboards, theremin, melodica,
 Hank Schroy – bass, fretless bass
 Curtis Watts – drums

References

External links
 Mistaken Identity at Discogs
 It's Only Rock 'n' Roll with Knobs On — By The Independent
 Crisscrossing the Cultural Boundaries — By Jon Pareles

1996 debut albums
Vernon Reid albums
Epic Records albums
Albums produced by Prince Paul (producer)
Albums produced by Teo Macero